The 1873 Yale Bulldogs football team represented Yale University in the 1873 college football season. The Bulldogs compiled a 2–1 record, winning games against Rutgers and Eton College (with Yale alumni) but losing to Princeton. William S. Halstead was the team captain.

Schedule

Standings

References

Yale
Yale Bulldogs football seasons
Yale Bulldogs football